Borkhar-e Markazi Rural District is a rural district (dehestan) in the Central District of Borkhar County, Isfahan Province, Iran. At the 2006 census, its population was 8,721, in 2,216 families.  The rural district has 4 villages.

References 

Rural Districts of Isfahan Province
Borkhar County